Ibrahim Al-Khub is a Jordanian footballer who plays as a midfielder for  Al-Ramtha and Jordan national football team.

References

External links 
 
 

Jordanian footballers
Association football midfielders
Living people
Jordan international footballers
Jordan youth international footballers
1996 births
Al-Ramtha SC players
Al-Sareeh SC players
Al-Jazeera (Jordan) players
Al-Faisaly SC players
Jordanian Pro League players